Sonja Gaudet (born July 22, 1966, in North Vancouver, British Columbia) is a Canadian wheelchair curler. She was on the team that won gold in wheelchair curling at the 2006 Winter Paralympics, the 2010 Winter Paralympics and the 2014 Winter Paralympics. She was also the Canadian Flag bearer for the 2014 Winter Paralympics. She currently resides in Vernon, British Columbia.

Results

References

External links

Profile at the Official Website for the 2010 Winter Paralympics in Vancouver

1966 births
Living people
Canadian women curlers
Canadian wheelchair curlers
Paralympic wheelchair curlers of Canada
Paralympic gold medalists for Canada
Paralympic medalists in wheelchair curling
Wheelchair curlers at the 2006 Winter Paralympics
Wheelchair curlers at the 2010 Winter Paralympics
Wheelchair curlers at the 2014 Winter Paralympics
Medalists at the 2006 Winter Paralympics
Medalists at the 2010 Winter Paralympics
Medalists at the 2014 Winter Paralympics
Curlers from British Columbia
People from North Vancouver
World wheelchair curling champions
Canadian wheelchair curling champions